The Upper Kuskokwim language (also called Kolchan or Goltsan or Dinak'i) is an Athabaskan language of the Na-Dené language family. It is spoken by the Upper Kuskokwim people in the Upper Kuskokwim River villages of Nikolai, Telida, and McGrath, Alaska. About 40 of a total of 160 Upper Kuskokwim people (Dichinanek’ Hwt’ana) still speak the language.

A practical orthography of the language was established by Raymond Collins, who in 1964 began linguistic work at Nikolai.

Since 1990s, the language has also been documented by a Russian linguist Andrej Kibrik.

Bibliography
 Alaska Native Language Center. Retrieved on 2007-03-14.
 Collins, Raymond and Sally Jo Collins. 2004. Dichinanek' Hwt'ana: A History of the people of the Upper Kuskokwim who live in Nikolai and Telida, Alaska. (Online: Alaska Native Language Archive item UK964C2004)

References

Links
 Upper Kuskokwim Language and Culture Preservation (website in development)
 Dinak'i | Upper Kuskokwim Dictionary iOS app

Northern Athabaskan languages
Indigenous languages of Alaska
Indigenous languages of the North American Subarctic
Endangered Athabaskan languages